

Ridge lift (or slope lift) is created when a wind strikes an obstacle, usually a mountain ridge or cliff, that is large and steep enough to deflect the wind upward.

If the wind is strong enough, the ridge lift provides enough upward force for gliders, hang gliders,  paragliders and birds to stay airborne for long periods or travel great distances by 'slope soaring'. Although unpowered aircraft are usually descending through the air, they will climb if the surrounding air is rising faster than their sink rates. Model glider enthusiasts refer to this technique as "slope gliding" or "sloping".

Orville Wright used ridge lift, setting a duration record of 11 minutes in 1911. However the sport of soaring started in Germany after the First World War.  In 1921, Dr. Wolfgang Klemperer broke the Wright Brothers’ 1911 soaring duration record with a flight of 13 minutes. In 1922, Arthur Martens became the first glider pilot to use an updraft rising along a mountain slope to stay aloft for a lengthy period, with a flight over an hour.

Basic requirements 

Ridge lift is generated when the wind blows against a hill, ridge, escarpment or ocean wave, causing the air to rise.  In meteorology this is known as orographic lift. The wind creates a region of rising air directly above the slope, which may extend some distance upwards and outwards from its face because the airflow follows the upward contour of the hill.  However, at near vertical cliffs, there is usually an area of turbulence with descending air near the base of the cliff. Downwind of the hill, lee waves can form; these are also used by glider pilots to gain height, but this should not be confused with slope lift.

Near slopes rather than vertical cliffs, the strongest lift is often to be found in a flight path that intersects with an imaginary line emerging at right angles from the slope.

Long mountain ranges such as those found in Ridge-and-valley Appalachians in the United States, New Zealand, and Chile have been used by glider pilots to fly in excess of a thousand kilometers in a single flight. Birds, such as many seabirds (in particular albatross) and raptors, also use slopes in this way.

See also

References

External links 
 Ridge flying the Mifflin task area 
 flying the Kittatinny Ridge
 A New Pilot’s Primer To Flying At The Ridge 

Gliding technology
Mountain meteorology
Radio-controlled aircraft